Sikandar Ali Shoro is a Pakistani politician who had been a Member of the Provincial Assembly of Sindh, from May 2013 to May 2018.

Early life 
He was born on 7 March 1976 in Kotri.

Political career

He was elected to the Provincial Assembly of Sindh as a candidate of Pakistan Peoples Party from Constituency PS-71 JAMSHORO-I in 2013 Pakistani general election.

References

Living people
Sindh MPAs 2013–2018
1976 births
Pakistan People's Party politicians
People from Jamshoro District